The 2009–10 Armenian Hockey League season was the ninth season of the Armenian Hockey League. Urartu Yerevan won the Armenian championship for the fourth consecutive year.

External links
Season on SFRP's Hockey Archive

Armenian Hockey League
Armenian Hockey League seasons
2009 in Armenian sport
2010 in Armenian sport